Brockhill may refer to:

People
 Thomas Brockhill, member of Parliament for Kent from 1382 to 1402 in the House of Commons of England
 Brockhill Taylor, member of Parliament for Cavan Borough from 1634 to 1635 in the Irish House of Commons
 Brockhill Newburgh, member of Parliament for Cavan County from 1715 to 1727 in the Irish House of Commons

Places
 Brockhill Country Park, a country park located in Kent, England
 Brockhill (HM Prison), a Young Offenders Institution at the Hewell Grange complex in Worcestershire, England
 Brockhill, Berkshire, a village in the civil parish of Winkfield, Berkshire, England
 Brockhill, Scottish Borders, a United Kingdom location